Captain Eric James Tucker, AC (21 October 1927 - 2 August 1957) was an Indian Army officer who was Posthumously awarded the highest peace time gallantry award, Ashok Chakra for an act of Gallantry in Nagaland.

Early life
Capt Eric James Tucker was born on 21 Oct 1927. He did his school from Stewart School, Cuttack. His father's name was Mr. Veera Vijaya Suckev.

Military career
Tucker was commissioned on a short-service commission in the Maratha Light Infantry on 13 July 1947. On 9 December 1949, he was appointed aide-de-camp to the GOC-in-C, Eastern Command, with the local rank of captain. On 1 August 1950, he received a regular commission as a lieutenant (seniority from 13 April 1950 and with seniority as second lieutenant from 13 April 1948). He was promoted captain on 13 April 1954.

The Naga insurgency
Naga Insurgency was India's first and oldest rebellion since independence. The guerrilla gangs were ferocious and battle trained. In 1956 Captain Eric James Tucker was commanding ‘B’ Company of the 2nd battalion of Maratha Light Infantry operating in the Naga Hills. He was given the task of opening the lines of communication from Chakabama to Phek, a distance of 42 miles and further to  Meluri, a distance of 20 miles. He successfully achieved his objective and reached to Meluri on 15 October 1956 after a successful encounter with a large number of hostile, armed with automatics and rifles, guerillas. Undeterred by the injuries sustained by him, he had kept fighting his way with great courage, inflicting many casualties on the enemies. Subsequently, Captain Tucker carried many dangerous and arduous tasks way beyond his duty relentless against several warnings from the rebels that they would kill him. On 1 Apr 1957, while operating in Naga Hills, he received information about rebel concentration at Chipokatami. He immediately rushed to the location, moving through dark jungles, took them by surprise and captured four rebels along with weapons. On 18 July 1957, he exercised a large maneuver, inflicted intense casualties and captured a number of prisoners. Similar to these tasks again on 2 August 1957, while proceeding from Khuzami to Kivikhu with a platoon, he was trapped in the thick undergrowth of the jungle by militants who had collected advance information about his movement. Captain Eric James Tucker got hit by the militants on the face and legs but he stood his ground, fought and engaged the militants till the last round. Finally, he charged at the militants just before being hit by an automatic burst of fire that killed him on the spot.

Ashoka Chakra awardee
Captain Eric James led his men with an extremely high order of personal courage and determination amidst hostile concentration. He was a great inspiration for his comrades and his devotion to duty and leadership are exemplary. For his gallantry and sacrifice, he was posthumously awarded Ashoka Chakra.

Captain Eric Tucker was one of the most determined soldiers of the Indian Army. He always took actions with clear and organized thoughts. He sacrificed his life for the nation at a very young age.

References

1927 births
1957 deaths
Recipients of the Ashoka Chakra (military decoration)